Prithvi Pal Sen was the King of Palpa.

Biography 
Prithvi Pal Sen was crowned the King of Palpa after the death of his father Mahadatta Sen.

Sen crowned Girvan Yuddha Bikram Shah as the King of Nepal after Rana Bahadur Shah had abdicated the throne.

He died in April 1806. After his death, Palpa became part of the Kingdom of Nepal.

References 

1806 deaths
18th-century Nepalese people
Nepalese Hindus
Nepalese monarchs
People from Palpa District
People of the Nepalese unification